626 Notburga is a large, dark asteroid orbiting the Sun in the asteroid belt.

References

External links
 
 

Background asteroids
Notburga
Notburga
CX-type asteroids (Tholen)
Xc-type asteroids (SMASS)
19070211